Starrucca Creek is an  tributary of the Susquehanna River in Susquehanna and Wayne counties, Pennsylvania in the United States. Shadigee Creek joins Starrucca Creek just downstream of Starrucca. Soon after passing under the Starrucca Viaduct, Starrucca Creek joins the Susquehanna near the borough of Lanesboro.

The former Stone Arch Bridge crossed Starrucca Creek at the borough of Starrucca.

See also
List of rivers of Pennsylvania

References

Rivers of Pennsylvania
Rivers of Susquehanna County, Pennsylvania
Tributaries of the Susquehanna River
Rivers of Wayne County, Pennsylvania